Salvia amplifrons is an annual or short-lived perennial herb that is endemic to Bolivia, growing at  elevation in forest shade on moist ground.

The  corolla is white with slight blue flushing.

Notes

amplifrons
Flora of Bolivia